"Zu heiß" (Too hot) is a song by Farin Urlaub Racing Team. It's the fourth and final single and the second track from the second CD "Kleines Album (Ponyhof)" from the album Die Wahrheit übers Lügen.

The single also includes the song "Der Frauenflüsterer", a live version of the song "Karten" and a video documentation about the touring of the band.

Track listing
"Zu heiß (Radio Edit)" (Too hot) – 4:00
"Der Frauenflüsterer" (The Woman Whisperer) – 4:04
"Karten (Live-Version)" (Cards) – 5:02
"Zu heiß" (Video) – 21:07

References 

2010 singles
Songs written by Farin Urlaub
Farin Urlaub Racing Team songs
2010 songs